Hyperpolarization has several meanings:

 Hyperpolarization (biology) occurs when the strength of the electric field across the width of a cell membrane increases 
 Hyperpolarization (physics) is the selective polarization of nuclear spin in atoms far beyond normal thermal equilibrium